The Assembly of European Regions (AER) is the largest independent network of regions in wider Europe. Bringing together regions 	
from 35 countries and 15 interregional organisations, AER is a forum for interregional cooperation.

Historical background 
On 15 June 1985, at Louvain-la-Neuve (Walloon Brabant), 47 Regions and 9 interregional organisations founded the Council of the Regions of Europe (CRE), which would later become the Assembly of European Regions in November 1987 at the second General meeting of the Regions of Europe in Brussels.		 	

The year 1985 was proclaimed by the United Nations as the International Youth Year. The same year AER launched its first programme, Eurodyssey, designed to promote and encourage youth mobility.		 	

In 1990, AER's Tabula Regionum Europae published the first map of its kind citing a Europe made up of regions and not simply of countries. The year after, the principle of subsidiarity became the leading AER campaign to promote the role of regions in all European and national decision-making processes. Soon thereafter its success was to be evident as the principle was recognized in the Maastricht Treaty of 1992.		 	

The creation of the Committee of the Regions (CoR) in 1994 and the Chamber of the Regions in the framework of the Congress of Local and Regional Authorities of Europe (CLRAE) in 1994, exemplified a victory for AER in advocating for the regions in Europe.		 	

In 1995, AER launched a campaign to promote regionalism in Europe. As a result, 300 AER members adopted in 1996 the Declaration on Regionalism in Europe immediately initializing a reference document for new and developing regions.

In 2002, AER presented its position on the “Future of Europe” to the European Convention. AER actively contributed to the drafting of the European Constitution, demonstrating strong political involvement. The final text included all AER proposals, namely
 The recognition of the regions as an important level of governance within Europe.
 The extension of the principle of subsidiarity to regional and local levels.
 The inclusion of regional cohesion in EU's objectives.
In 2008, AER established the Youth Regional Network, Europe's first and only platform of regional youth councils, parliaments and organisations.

Definition of "Region"

According to the AER statutes, in principle the term "region" refers to a territorial authority existing at the level immediately below that of the central government, with its own political representation in the form of an elected regional assembly.

Members
Member regions of the Assembly of European Regions come from the following countries:

List of presidents of the AER 

Magnus Berntsson - Västra Götaland (Sweden) 2017–Present
Hande Özsan Bozatlı - Istanbul (Turkey) - 2013–2017
Michèle Sabban - Île-de-France (France) - 2008–2013
Riccardo Illy - Friuli-Venezia-Giulia (Italy) - 2004–2008
Liese Prokop - Lower Austria (Austria) - 2000–2004
Luc Van den Brande - Flanders (Belgium) - 1996–2000
Jordi Pujol - Catalonia (Spain) - 1992-1996
Carlo Bernini - Veneto (Italy) - 1988–1992
Edgar Faure - Franche-Comté (France) - 1985–1988

See also
European integration
Regions of Europe

References

 
International organizations based in France
Organizations based in Strasbourg
Regions of Europe
International organizations based in Europe
Paradiplomacy
European integration